The Tommy Bartlett Exploratory is an attraction in Wisconsin Dells, Wisconsin with over 150 interactive science displays. It is the sister attraction to the long-running Tommy Bartlett's Thrill Show. When it opened in 1982, it was called Tommy Bartlett's Robot World & Exploratory, but many of the robot displays have since been eliminated.

In 1996, Bartlett bid on and purchased one of Russia's spare Mir Space Station core modules.  This space station is on display at the Exploratory.

References

External links 
Tommy Bartlett Exploratory

Companies based in Wisconsin
Wisconsin Dells, Wisconsin
Museums in Sauk County, Wisconsin
Science museums in Wisconsin